Eburna glabrata is a species of sea snail, a marine gastropod mollusk in the family Ancillariidae, the olives.

Description

Distribution
Venezuela, North coast of South America.

References

Ancillariidae
Gastropods described in 1758
Taxa named by Carl Linnaeus